The Swimming competition at the 18th Central American and Caribbean Games was swum August 9–15, 1998 in Maracaibo, Venezuela. It featured events in a long course (50m) pool.

Results

Men

Women

Medal standings

References
 The Oldest Regional Games: Central American & Caribbean Sports Games, by Enrique Montesinos. Published by CACSO in 2009; retrieved 2012–04.

Swimming at the Central American and Caribbean Games
1998 in swimming
1998 Central American and Caribbean Games